Evanswood is an unincorporated community in the town of Weyauwega, Waupaca County, Wisconsin, United States. The community was named for an early settler named Evan Townsend, who became the first postmaster when the post office was established in September 1854.

Notes

Unincorporated communities in Waupaca County, Wisconsin
Unincorporated communities in Wisconsin